The Japan national football team in 2017, managed by head coach Vahid Halilhodžić compete in the 2018 FIFA World Cup qualification – AFC Third Round and 2017 EAFF E-1 Football Championship among international friendly matches both at home and abroad.

Record

Kits
On 7 June, Japan used special kit to celebrate 20th anniversary of Japan's qualification to their first World Cup finals. It was used against Syria. Since November, a new home kit is used.

Matches

Players statistics

Goalscorers

References

External links
Japan Football Association

Japan national football team results
2017 in Japanese football
Japan